Team Muhafiz is a Pakistani comic book series featuring an organized group of fictional teenage Pakistani crime fighting superheroes launched in August 2015. The team faces the real-life issues of trafficking, terrorism and in its third issue, child marriages. The goal of the team is to fight these real-life social issues that have haunted Karachi, including extremists ideologies and consists of members belonging to Islam as well as minority religions, such as Christianity.

Animated series (2022)
The Inter-Services Public Relations (ISPR) is starting an animated series, directed by Riyan Durrani. The series is a joint venture of ISPR & Geo Productions in association with AZ Corp. Fahad Nabi is the producer of the series while its art director is Kamran Khan while this master piece Script is written by renowned writer Fakhir Rizvi.

The OST 'Dil Fatah Karain' released on June 3, 2022, on social media.

Soch Band, Karakoram, and Young Stunners are featured in the song "Dil Fatah Karain" Asim Raza and Adnan Dhol's “Bol” has been composed by Soch Band and Sherry Khattak.

Ali Mustafa and Asif Hassan were in charge of Mix and Mastered. Fahad Nabi, animation director Kamran Khan, and director Ryan Durrani produced the video.

Cast

References

External links
Main site
Facebook page
Instagram

2015 comics debuts
Pakistani comics
Superhero teams